Wagener is a town in Aiken County, South Carolina, United States. The population was 797 at the 2010 census, making it the largest settlement in the county north of the South Fork Edisto River. It is part of the Augusta, Georgia metropolitan area.

Geography
Wagener is located in eastern Aiken County at  (33.652701, -81.364187).

Demographics

2020 census

As of the 2020 United States census, there were 631 people, 320 households, and 261 families residing in the town.

2012
As of the census of 2012, there were 809 people, 368 (45.5%) males, and 441 (54.5%) females. Median resident age was 38.4

2000 census
As of the census of 2000, there were 863 people, 347 households, and 239 families residing in the town. The racial makeup of the town was 61.53% African American, 37.54% White, 0.35% Asian, and 0.58% from two or more races. Hispanic or Latino of any race were 0.93% of the population.

There were 347 households, out of which 32.6% had children under the age of 18 living with them, 38.0% were married couples living together, 26.2% had a female householder with no husband present, and 31.1% were non-families. 27.4% of all households were made up of individuals, and 13.0% had someone living alone who was 65 years of age or older. The average household size was 2.49 and the average family size was 3.04.

In the town, the population was spread out, with 28.2% under the age of 18, 9.4% from 18 to 24, 26.4% from 25 to 44, 22.6% from 45 to 64, and 13.4% who were 65 years of age or older. The median age was 36 years. For every 100 females, there were 88.0 males. For every 100 females age 18 and over, there were 81.8 males.

The median income for a household in the town was $24,773, and the median income for a family was $29,833. Males had a median income of $28,182 versus $17,212 for females. The per capita income for the town was $13,805. About 15.2% of families and 17.9% of the population were below the poverty line, including 25.0% of those under age 18 and 18.4% of those age 65 or over

History
Gunter's Crossroad
The history of Wagener dates back to 1887. The early settlement was known as Pinder Town and later as Guntersville or Gunter's Crossroad, after the large number of North Carolinian settlers named Gunter. These men helped make up Company I of the 20th SC Infantry, which was part of Kershaw's Brigade during the Civil War. The town is situated on what was once farm land belonging to Elridge Gunter. He donated this property to benefit the schools of Wagener and the First Baptist Church.

The Southern Railroad
The little town grew when the Southern Railroad ran a line through to Batesburg. Nearly all of the towns that sprang up along the railroad wanted to use the last name of George Wagener, who was a strong supporter of the railroad and the owner of a wholesale house in Charleston. It was through the influence of J. A. Gunter, a prosperous local farmer, that the town received the honor of using this distinguished name.

In the 1920s and 1930s, asparagus was grown here and exported across America. During the same period, cotton became a successful product and huge bales lined the streets awaiting departure via train. The children of Wagener frolicked among the hay bales during their games of hide-n-seek. A central town park is located where the railroad beds were.

Education
Wagener has a public library, a branch of the ABBE Regional Library System.

References

External links
 

Towns in Aiken County, South Carolina
Towns in South Carolina
Augusta metropolitan area